The flame tetra (Hyphessobrycon flammeus), also known as the red tetra or Rio tetra, is a small freshwater fish of the characin family Characidae. This tetra was first introduced as aquarium fish in 1920 by C. Bruening, Hamburg, Germany, and  formally described in 1924 by Dr. George S. Myers. Today large numbers are bred in captivity and it is common in the aquarium trade, but the remaining wild population in Southeast Brazil is highly threatened.

Cuba produced a postal stamp with an image of H. flammeus in 1978.

Description

The rear half of the body is flame red while the area in front of the dorsal fin is silver crossed by two dark vertical bars. All the fins are red except for the pectoral fins, which are colourless. The tip of the anal fin on the male is black, while on the female the fins have less red colouration but darker tips of the pectoral fins.

Distribution, habitat and status 
The flame tetra is native to Southeast Brazil, where it occurs in coastal parts of Rio de Janeiro (Guanabara bay region, and Paraíba do Sul and Guandu River basins) and São Paulo (upper Tietê River basin).

The species has declined drastically, mainly because of habitat loss, pollution and introduced species (especially tilapia and black bass). Although sometimes reported as extinct in the wild, wild populations survive. In its small remaining distribution, it is common in the Tietê River basin (which possibly is not natural, but introduced) and rare elsewhere. The last confirmed record from Rio de Janeiro is from 1992. The species is listed as endangered in the Brazilian national red list.

Today large numbers are bred in captivity and it is common in the aquarium trade. This includes some selectively-bred forms (such as golden, orange and albino) that differ from the original wild form.

Aquarium keeping and captive breeding 
H. flammeus is a peaceful schooling fish, and will generally do well in groups.  H. flammeus has an omnivorous diet.  The species will breed in captivity.

References 

 Géry, J. 1977. Characoids of the World. T.F.H. Publications, Inc., N.J. 672p.

External links 

 Flame tetra fact sheet 

Tetras
Taxa named by George S. Myers
Fish described in 1924